The  is a Lutheran church in Kumamoto, Japan.

History
The church was built on June 20, 1905. On July 1, 1945, it was destroyed in an air raid. Reconstruction of the church was completed on May 2, 1950.

External links
 

20th-century Lutheran churches